Jessica Sanders is an American producer, director and screenwriter.

Accolades 
Together with Freida Lee Mock, Sanders was a nominee for the Best Short Documentary in 2001 for the film Sing!. Further, she won the Special Jury Prize at the Sundance Film Festival 2005 for the documentary After Innocence.

References

External links
 

Year of birth missing (living people)
Living people
American documentary film producers
American women documentary filmmakers
21st-century American women